Byssoloma brunneodiscum is a species of  foliicolous (leaf-dwelling) lichen in the family Pilocarpaceae. Found in China, it was formally described as a new species in 2020 by Wei-Cheng Wang and Jiang-Chun Wei. It is only known to occur at high-altitude rainforests on Hainan Island, where it grows sparsely on leaf surfaces in the damp understorey. The specific epithet brunneodiscum refers to the brown discs that are characteristic of the apothecia of this species. The lichen makes 2,5,7-trichloro-3-O-methylnorlichexanthone, a secondary chemical that is detectable using thin-layer chromatography. Byssoloma annuum is similar in appearance and chemistry, but is distinguished from B. brunneodiscum by its orange-yellow apothecia and colourless hypothecium.

References

Pilocarpaceae
Lichen species
Lichens described in 2020
Lichens of China